Umudly (also, Umutly) is a village in the Tartar Rayon of Azerbaijan.  The village forms part of the municipality of Sarov.

Notes

References 

Populated places in Tartar District